Maadal is the first all-women professional group of Bengali folk singers, formed in 2002 in West Bengal. They showcase both 'epar bangla and opar bangla'. The traditional folk instrument of Bengal - 'maadal' represents their kind of music.

The word 'maadal' can be broken up into two parts - 'maa' & 'dal' respectively signifying mother and group.

Singers
Sikha Bhattacharya - M.A. in Music(Folk Song) from Rabindra Bharati University in 1988 with First Class. Has been awarded 'Sangeet Visharad' by Pracheen Kala Kendra, Chandigarh in 1983.
Sonia Ghosh (Sen) - B.A. in Bengali Song from Rabindra Bharati University in 2007. M.A. in Folk Song from Rabindra Bharati University in 2009 with 1st class.
Sarmishtha Chatterjee - M.A. in English from Rabindra Bharati University and have conventional training in Rabindra Sangeet and classical Music. From PINCON Group.
Tupsi Sarkar - MBA in Marketing and Finance with 1st division marks. Ranked 2nd in MBA by Heritage Institute of Technology (WBUT) in 2008. Learnt Classical Music,Ghazals,Bhajans and Geets from Smt .Mandira Lahiri. Has been awarded “Sangeet Prabhakar” (Vocal Classical Music) by Allahabad Board with 1st Division marks in 2008.
Sampa Sardar (Biswas) - Senior Diploma in Classical Music from Allahabad Board in 1998 (1st Division with distinction). B.A(Hons) in Political Science from C.U. in 2007. M.A.(Appeared) in Bengali Song from Rabindra Bharati University.
Palashpriya Bhattacharya - Masters in Food and Nutrition, ranked 4th in the University of Calcutta. Works as a lecturer in a college. A trained Odissi dancer. Not formally trained in music but has always been inspired and guided by her mother Sikha Bhattacharya who is also a team member of Maadal

Accompanists
Shankar Saha -bangladhol,khol,dhol,madol
Suranjeet Roy - tabla,khanjira
pankaj das - Percussion 
Suvam kanjilal - Banjo/Mandolin

Deep Mukherjee - Keyboard
santanu chakraborty -keyboard

Album
KIYA PHOOL - Released 2016
PRAN JHARNA (Asha Audio) -  released on 2012
URAPANKHI (Asha Audio) - released 2009
MAYA LAGAI SE (Asha Audio) - released on 
SOUNDARI KAMALA (Asha Audio)- released on 14 September 2006.
BANDEY JANANI (Cozmik Harmony) -  released on 18 January 2005.
CHIRANTANI (Cozmik Harmony)- released on 10 March 2004.

External links
http://www.maadal.org Official Website

References

Bengali music
Indian musical groups
Bengali musicians
Musical groups established in 2002